Roy Taylor (1883–1934) was an Australian tennis player and also represented Australia at lacrosse. He was a stockbroker by profession. He won the South Australian State singles championship in 1912, 1913 and 1919. Taylor made his debut at the Australasian Championships in 1910 (losing in round one to Harry Parker). In the 1913 semi finals, the big serving Taylor led Harry Parker 5-1 in the third set (sets were 1-1) when he sprained his ankle. Although Taylor managed the cling on to take the third set, he lost the next two easily. In 1914 Taylor lost in the quarter finals to Rupert Wertheim. In 1919 Taylor led Gerald Patterson two sets to 0 in round two before having to retire. In 1920 Taylor lost in the semis to Pat O'Hara Wood. Taylor died suddenly while sitting at home with his family in 1934 aged 51.

Grand Slam finals

Doubles: (2 runner-ups)

References

1883 births
1934 deaths
Australian male tennis players
Date of birth missing
Tennis people from South Australia
20th-century Australian people